Bouchaib Benlabsir (27 June 1931 – 4 December 1991) was a Moroccan politician. In 1977, Benlabsir was elected to the Parliament of Morocco, representing the Settat constituency as an independent. He received 84.02% of the votes for his district. Benlabsir died on 4 December 1991 in Toulouse, France.

References

	
Members of the Parliament of Morocco
1931 births
1991 deaths
People from Settat